Unionville is a suburban community in the Delaware Valley located on Pennsylvania Route 309. It is mainly in Hatfield Township, Montgomery County but also in Hilltown Township, Bucks County, Pennsylvania, United States. 

Route 309 (Bethlehem Pike) follows the county line between the beginning of the expressway and Line Lexington. Montgomery students are served by North Penn School District, while Bucks students are served by Pennridge School District. It is drained by the West Branch Neshaminy Creek, a tributary of the Neshaminy Creek. It is served by the Hatfield post office, which uses the ZIP code of 19440. Dock Meadows has a Mennonite-affiliated retirement community in the Bucks portion of Unionville.

References

Unincorporated communities in Bucks County, Pennsylvania
Unincorporated communities in Montgomery County, Pennsylvania
Unincorporated communities in Pennsylvania